The House of Fear was a 1915 American silent mystery film based on a story by John T. McIntyre. It was the third and final film in the Ashton-Kirk, Investigator series, all directed by Ashley Miller and Arnold Daly and starring Daly.

This film is presumed lost.

Synopsis
Grace Cramp (Jeanne Eagels) and her brother Charles (Sheldon Lewis), ask Ashton-Kirk to investigate strange events involving Mexicans that are occurring at their house. Ashton-Kirk learns from information provided by an agent in Mexico that their father had been an engraver who made forged currency plates when in need of money. The siblings' father had forged currency plates for a thief (Charles Kraus) but had never delivered them. The thief's aunt, Miss Hohenlo (Ina Hammer), and her accomplices have been breaking into the father's house to try to find the engraving plates. Ashton-Kirk captures the intruders and destroys the forged plates.

Cast
Arnold Daly as Ashton-Kirk
Sheldon Lewis as Charles Cramp
Jeanne Eagels as Grace Cramp
Ina Hammer as Miss Hohenlo
Charles Laite as Harry Pendleton
Charles Kraus as Alva
William Bechtel
Martin Sabine

Production
After his popular portrayal of detective Craig Kennedy in the Pearl White serial The Exploits of Elaine, Pathé signed Arnold Daly to do his own series featuring Ashton-Kirk, a detective character created by John T. McIntyre. The House of Fear was the third and last film in the series; the first was An Affair of Three Nations, followed by The Menace of the Mute.

Release
The House of Fear was released December 3, 1915.

The film received a favorable review in The Moving Picture World, which said that it was "... splendidly produced and has action every moment". The Motography reviewer was also positive and remarked on how it held the interest. The reviewer for the New York Dramatic Mirror judged the plot "none too strong", but was impressed by the camerawork: "Seldom has more perfect photography been seen in any picture." Hammer's performance as the aunt was also singled out as "very good".

See also
Film preservation
List of lost films

References

External links

1915 films
American silent feature films
American black-and-white films
Films based on short fiction
Lost American films
Film serials
American mystery films
1915 mystery films
Pathé Exchange films
1915 lost films
Lost mystery films
1910s American films
Silent mystery films